Pastis (or ) is an anise-flavoured spirit and apéritif traditionally from France, typically containing less than 100 g/L sugar and 40–45% ABV (alcohol by volume).

Origins
Pastis was first commercialized by Paul Ricard in 1932 and enjoys substantial popularity in France, especially in the southeastern regions of the country, mostly Marseille, (Bouches-du-Rhône) and the Var department. Pastis emerged some 17 years after the ban on absinthe, during a time when the French nation was still apprehensive of high-proof anise drinks in the wake of the absinthe debacle. The popularity of pastis may be attributable to a penchant for anise drinks that was cultivated by absinthe decades earlier, but is also part of an old tradition of Mediterranean anise liquors that includes sambuca, ouzo, arak, rakı, and mastika. The name "pastis" may be derived from Occitan "pastís," a mash-up or blend, or French "pastiche," a stylistic imitation.

Composition
By legal definition, pastis is described as an anise-flavoured spirit that contains additional flavor of liquorice root, contains less than 100 grams per litre of sugar, and is bottled at a minimum of 40% ABV (pastis) or 45% ABV (pastis de Marseille). While pastis was originally artisanally produced from whole herbs like most spirits at the time of its creation, modern versions are typically prepared by mixing base alcohol with commercially prepared flavorings (essences and/or extracts) and caramel coloring.

Pastis is often compared with its historical predecessor, absinthe, yet the two are quite different. Pastis was created years following the prohibition of absinthe, and traditionally does not contain grand wormwood (Artemisia absinthium), the herb from which absinthe derives its name. Also, pastis far more commonly obtains its anise flavour from star anise, an Asian spice, whereas absinthe traditionally obtains its base flavour from a distillation of green anise and fennel, both Mediterranean herbs. Additionally, pastis typically exhibits some degree of flavour derived from liquorice root, which is not traditionally employed for absinthe. Where bottled strength is concerned, traditional absinthes were bottled at 45–74% ABV, while pastis is typically bottled at 40–50% ABV. Finally, whereas traditional absinthe is invariably a dry spirit, pastis may be bottled with sugar.

Serving
Pastis is normally diluted with water before drinking, generally five volumes of water for one volume of pastis, but often neat pastis is served together with a jug of water for the drinker to blend together according to preference. The resulting decrease in alcohol percentage causes some of the constituents to become insoluble, which changes the liqueur's appearance from dark transparent yellow to milky soft yellow, a phenomenon also present with absinthe and known as louche or the ouzo effect. The drink is consumed cold and considered a refreshment for hot days. Ice cubes can be added (after the water, in order to avoid crystallization of the anethole in the pastis). However, many pastis drinkers decline to add ice, preferring to drink the beverage with cool spring water.

Although consumed throughout France, pastis is generally associated with southeastern regions of the country, particularly the city of Marseille, where it is nicknamed Pastaga, and with such clichés of the Provençal lifestyle as pétanque.

130 million litres are sold each year (more than two litres per inhabitant in France).

Chemistry
Pastis beverages become cloudy when diluted because they are anise-based. Such beverages contain oils called terpenes, which are soluble in an aqueous solution that contains 30% ethanol or more by volume. When the solution is diluted to below 30% ethanol, the terpenes become insoluble; this causes a cloudy precipitate to form in the solution. The same chemistry causes absinthe to go cloudy when diluted.

Cocktails

Among the better known cocktails using pastis and syrups are:
 : made with strawberry syrup
  (French for "tomato"): made with grenadine syrup
  (French for "parrot"): made with green mint syrup
  (French for "Moorish"): made with orgeat syrup
 Feuille morte (French for "dead leaf"): made with grenadine and green mint syrup
 Violet: made with lavender syrup 
 Rômarino: made with Rosemary syrup 
 Sazerac: made with cognac or rye whiskey; pastis mentioned as a substitute for absinthe in some recipes
 Momisette: (French for “little mother” or “godmother”) made with orgeat and orange flower water

Notable brands
Henri Bardouin made by Distilleries et Domaines de Provence
Ricard, Pernod, Pastis 51, Pacific made by Pernod Ricard

See also
 Absinthe
 Anisette
 Rakı

References

Absinthe
Anise liqueurs and spirits
Cuisine of Provence
French liqueurs
Liqueurs
Occitan cuisine
Pernod Ricard brands